The Birch Wathen Lenox School is a college preparatory K-12 school on the Upper East Side of Manhattan in New York City. Birch Wathen Lenox comprises approximately 500 students from all around New York City. The Birch Wathen Lenox School is one of 322 independent schools located in the city.

History
Birch Wathen Lenox was created in 1991 through the merger of the Birch Wathen School (founded in 1921 by Louise Birch and Edith Wathen), and The Lenox School (founded in 1916 by Jessica Garretson Finch).

The Lenox School had been an all-girls school until 1974, when it went co-educational.  

Between 1962 and 1989, Birch Wathen was located in the Herbert N. Straus House, an ornate French-style building at 9 East 71st Street across from the Frick Collection, and later home to Jeffrey Epstein.

Sports
Birch Wathen Lenox fields teams in soccer, volleyball, swimming, basketball, baseball, softball, cross country, track and field, golf, tennis, and hockey. 

Athletic teams play under the auspices of the Independent Schools Athletic League (New York) or the Girls Independent School Athletic League, which are leagues in the NYSAISAA (New York State Association of Independent Schools Athletic Association).

Notable alumni
Alfred A Knopf, Jr., publisher
Barbara Walters, journalist, writer, and media personality
Joel Crothers (BW '58), actor
Judith Krantz (BW '44), novelist
Robert Gottlieb, president of Knopf Publishing.
Hope Cooke, last Queen of Sikkim.
Murray Rothbard (BW '42), Founder of anarcho-capitalism
Edwin Schlossberg, designer 
Mary Stolz (BW '36), novelist
Gardiner L. Tucker (BW '43), former director of IBM Research, Assistant Secretary of State, Assistant Secretary General of NATO
Barbara Costikyan, food writer
John Katzman, edupreneur, CEO of Noodle

References
Notes

External links
Birch Wathen Lenox School website
Birch Wathen Lenox School at Private School Review
The Birch Wathen Lenox School listing in the Bunting & Lyon Blue Book
Architectural essay on the midcentury BW building.
Architectural essay on the midcentury Lenox building.

Private K-12 schools in Manhattan